The 2008 Damallsvenskan was the 21st season of the Damallsvenskan, the highest level of professional women's football in Sweden, with 12 teams competing. The season ran from 6 April to 18 October. For the fourth time in a row the league was won by Umeå IK. Newly promoted Umeå Södra were  relegated, as were Bälinge. Manon Melis and Marta finished as the season's top scorers with 23 goals. Prior to the season's last game, Marta was on 17 goals, but she managed to catch up with Melis by scoring six times in an 11–1 win over relegated Bälinge.

Summary
The game Linköpings FC–Umeå IK (1–4) on 3 september was played at Folkungavallen in Linköping in front of 9 413 spectators, leading to a new Damallsvenskan record attendance.

Table

References

Damallsvenskan seasons
2008 in association football
2008 in Swedish sport